Valentina  is a Mexican telenovela produced by José Alberto Castro for Televisa in 1993. The second part of telenovela based on La Galleguita original story of Inés Rodena.

The first part of telenovela Verónica Castro and Juan Ferrara starred as protagonists, while Blanca Guerra starred as main antagonist.

The second part of telenovela Verónica Castro and Rafael Rojas starred as protagonists, while Mayra Rojas, Hugo Acosta and Diana Golden starred as antagonists.

Cast

First part
 Verónica Castro as Valentina Isabel Montero
 Juan Ferrara as Fernando Alcántara
 Blanca Guerra as Deborah Andrade
 Hugo Acosta as Félix
 Guillermo García Cantú as Víctor Luján
 Raúl Meraz as Don Rogelio Montero
 Aurora Molina as Prudencia
 Celia Cruz as Lecumé
 Zaide Silvia Gutiérrez as Rafaela
 Mario Iván Martínez as Maurice Taylor
 Rafael Sánchez Navarro as Renato Saldívar
 Dobrina Cristeva as Leticia de Alcántara/Ana María Miranda
 Andrea Legarreta as Constanza "Connie" Basurto
 Mercedes Molto as Luisita Basurto
 Daniel Edid Bracamontes as Toñito
 Lily Blanco as Julia
 Alejandro Ruiz as Pablo Martínez
 Tatiana as Leonor
 Juan Carlos Bonet as Osvaldo
 Manola Saavedra as Doña Irene
 Javier Gómez as Willy
 Aracely as Estela Montero
 Gloria Izaguirre as Rosita
 Angelita Castany as Bárbara
 Pedro Altamirano as Gerardo Antúnez
 Darío T. Pie as Bobby
 Claudio Brook as Alfred Van Dutren
 Eduardo Liñán as Sargento Mijares
 Ofelia Guilmáin as Doña Federica Alcántara
 Joaquín Garrido as Enrique
 Gerardo Franco as Luciano
 Maricruz Nájera as Gloria Luque
 Josefina Echánove as Evangelina
 Dalilah Polanco as Consuelito
 Margarita Isabel as Martha Villalón
 María Moret as Dr. Diana
 Martha Mariana Castro as Marieta
 Vanessa Angers as Lourdes
 Lucero Reynoso as Carmen
 Cecilia Romo as Mother Eugenia
 José Luis González y Carrasco as Dr. Ramírez
 Helio Castillos as Miguel
 Germán Blando as Beltrán
 Sergio Jiménez as Jacinto "El Bokor"

Second part
 Verónica Castro as Valentina Paulina de los Ángeles "Angelita" Pérez Lopez
 Rafael Rojas as Julio Carmona Hugo Acosta as José Manuel Corrales Mayra Rojas as Rebeca Diana Golden as Daniela Valdepeñas de Corrales Arturo García Tenorio as Arnulfo Chaparra Lucila Mariscal as Amada Paniagua "La Desvielada" Yolanda Mérida as Amparo de Pérez Manuel "Flaco" Ibáñez as Rigoberto "Rigo" Pérez Meche Barba as Eloína Enrique Novi as Enrique David Ostrosky as Diego Norma Lazareno as Alicia de Valdepeñas Juan Peláez as Ernesto Valdepeñas Yolanda Ciani as Lucrecia de Carmona Luis Couturier as Conrado Carmona Alicia Montoya as Berta Tatiana as Leonor Laura Forastieri as Raquel Rivera Raúl Meraz as Don Rogelio Montero Aurora Molina as Prudencia Luis Javier Posada as Jorge Daniel Edid Bracamontes as Toñito''

Awards

References

External links

1993 telenovelas
Mexican telenovelas
1993 Mexican television series debuts
1994 Mexican television series endings
Spanish-language telenovelas
Television shows set in Mexico
Televisa telenovelas